Cody Connelly is an American motorcycle builder, best known for his work at Orange County Choppers (OCC), the subject of the American TV show American Chopper. Cody left Orange County Choppers and joined V-Force Customs (a custom motorcycle shop in Rock Tavern, NY) where he works with friend and former colleague of Orange County Choppers Vincent DiMartino. Cody has since made several appearances on the show American Chopper: Senior vs. Junior alongside Paul Teutul Jr. and DiMartino, helping out at Paul Jr. Designs.

History 
Cody Connelly was born to Sean Connelly and Darci Dembeck. He has a younger sister named Tylar Connelly. At the age of five he received his first bike, an XR-50. Connelly learned how to maintain bikes from his father by working on their bikes together.

Career 
Connelly's first job was at Orange County Choppers (2001–2007), during which he attended Valley Central High School (Graduated 2005), BOCES and AMI (American Motorcycle Institute). The tuition fee for AMI was paid by Orange County Choppers as part of his training; therefore after attending AMI, Connelly returned to work at OCC.

In early 2003 just before the first episode of American Chopper, Connelly was involved in the design and build of a bike that became known as "The Cody Project".

As it was a commercial bike for sale, the Cody Bike was sold for an undisclosed sum and the customer collected the bike during the 2003 Daytona Beach Bike Week. This was played out during episode 6 of Season 1 of the series.

In October 2007 Connelly left to team up with Vincent DiMartino at V-Force Customs.

Subsequently, Connelly sued Orange County Choppers and Paul Teutul Sr., seeking damages for misappropriation of likeness, breach of contract and fraud. He claimed the show used his likeness in posters, coloring books and other merchandise after he left it in October 2007. Connelly also claimed that he never received "an old school chopper" that he helped design, though the shop's owner, defendant Paul Teutul Sr. gave it to him in one episode of the show.

References

External links
 

Living people
Motorcycle builders
American Chopper
1987 births